The Census of Quirinius is generally believed to be a census of Judea taken by Publius Sulpicius Quirinius, governor of Roman Syria, upon the imposition of direct Roman rule in 6 CE. The Gospel of Luke uses it to date the birth of Jesus, which the Gospel of Matthew places in the time of Herod the Great (who died between 5 BCE and 1 CE). Luke appears to have conflated Quirinius's census with the death of Herod, and most critical scholars acknowledge a confusion and misdating by Luke.

Overview

Herod I (Herod the Great), was a Roman client king whose territory included Judea. Upon his death, his kingdom was divided into three, each section ruled by one of his sons. In 6 CE, Emperor Augustus deposed Herod Archelaus, who had ruled the largest section, and converted his territory into the Roman province of Judea. Publius Sulpicius Quirinius, the legate (governor) of the province of Roman Syria starting in 6 CE, was assigned to carry out a census of the new province of Judea for tax purposes. This was a property tax, and required that the value of real property be registered along with the identity of the owners. The census triggered a revolt of Jewish extremists (called Zealots) under the leadership of Judas of Galilee. (Galilee itself was a separate territory under the rule of Herod Antipas.) Judas seems to have found the census objectionable because it ran counter to a biblical injunction (the traditional Jewish reading of ) and because it would lead to taxes paid in heathen coins bearing an image of the emperor.

A first-century funerary inscription of a prefect named Quintus Aemilius Secundus mentions his service served under Quirinius in Syria, where he oversaw the census in Apamea.

In Christianity

Gospel of Luke
Contrary to the Gospel of Matthew, which places Jesus's birth in the time of Herod I, the Gospel of Luke correlates Christ's birth with the census: 

Luke's apparent error has led most biblical scholars to acknowledge that this gospel is incorrect. Luke seems to have incorporated the census to move Joseph and Mary from Nazareth, "their own city", to Bethlehem, where the birth was to occur. (The author of Matthew had the reverse problem; believing that Joseph, Mary and Jesus lived in a house in Bethlehem prior to their flight into Egypt, they move to Nazareth to avoid the recently appointed Herod Archelaus.) Luke's author may also have wanted to contrast the rebellious Zealots with the peaceable Joseph and Mary, who had obeyed the Roman edict, and to find a prophetic fulfilment of Psalm 87:6: "In the census of the peoples, this one will be born there." (In the Greek or Septuagint version, it is "princes" who will be born.)

Scholars point out that there was no single census of the entire Roman Empire under Augustus and the Romans did not directly tax client kingdoms; further, no Roman census required that people travel from their own homes to those of their ancestors. A census of Judea would not have affected Joseph and his family, who lived in Galilee under a different ruler; the revolt of Judas of Galilee suggests that Rome's direct taxation of Judea was new at the time. Catholic priest and biblical scholar Raymond E. Brown postulates that Judas's place of origin may have led the author of Luke to think that Galilee was subject to the census, although the region is clearly distinguished from Judea elsewhere in the gospel. Brown also points out that in the Acts of the Apostles, Luke the Evangelist (the traditional author of both books) dates Judas's census-incited revolt as following Theudas's rebellion of four decades later.

Second century AD 
The writings of the second-century Christian apologist Justin Martyr (c. 100 – c. 165) assert that census records existed in archives evidencing Jesus' birth:

Now there is a village in the land of the Jews, thirty-five stadia from Jerusalem, in which Jesus Christ was born, as you can ascertain also from the registers of the taxing made under [Quirinius], your first procurator in Judæa.

Alternative views
Some religious scholars have made attempts to reconcile Luke's text with the evidence that Jesus' birth took place earlier than the  6 CE census. To do so whilst accepting that Luke is referring to the Census of Quirinius "conflicts with historical reality", but Barnett theorizes that an earlier census unrelated to taxation took place. Brown points out that this requires the scripture to be reinterpreted to mean that the census took place before Quirinius's tenure.  Nollet (2012) argues that the census of Luke’s gospel was not the census of AD 6, but rather the Pater Patriae census in 2 BC; Quirinius (contra Novak who had argued that the career of Quirinius and the names and dates of the governors are well documented and there is no time before 6 CE when he could have served an earlier term as governor of Syria). having served two terms as governor of Syria and conducted two censuses in Judea.

Gallery

See also

 Chronology of Jesus
 Date of birth of Jesus
 Gospel harmony
 List of Roman governors of Syria
 Roman administration of Judaea (AD 6–135)
 Roman censor

References
Footnotes

Citations

Bibliography

 
 
 
 
 

 
 
 
 
 
 

 
0s in the Roman Empire
1st-century Christianity
AD 6
Censuses
Gospel of Luke
Jesus and history
Judea (Roman province)
Jews and Judaism in the Roman Empire
Nativity of Jesus in the New Testament